The 1929 UCI Road World Championships took place in Zürich, Switzerland.

Events summary

References

 
UCI Road World Championships by year
W
R
R